Hatamari Hennu Kiladi Gandu is a 1992 Indian Kannada-language drama film directed by Renuka Sharma and written by P. Kalaimani. The film stars Malashri, Sridhar and Anjana. The film's music was composed by Rajan–Nagendra and the audio was launched on the Lahari Music banner. The film was a remake of Tamil film En Purushanthaan Enakku Mattumthaan.

Cast 

Malashri 
Sridhar
Anjana
Mukhyamantri Chandru
Ramesh Bhat
Jaggesh
Umashri
Abhinaya
Vaishali Kasaravalli
Mysore Lokesh
Bangalore Nagesh
Mandeep Roy
Keerthiraj
 Baby Sindhu
Vaijanath Biradar

Soundtrack 
The music of the film was composed by Rajan–Nagendra with lyrics by Chi. Udaya Shankar.

References 

1992 films
1990s Kannada-language films
Indian drama films
Films scored by Rajan–Nagendra
Kannada remakes of Tamil films
Films directed by Renuka Sharma
1992 drama films

kn:ಹಠಮಾರಿಹೆಣ್ಣು ಕಿಲಾಡಿಗಂಡು